This is a list of the seasons played by Legia Warsaw from 1906 when the club first entered a league competition to the most recent seasons. The club's achievements in all major national and international competitions as well as the top scorers are listed. Top scorers in bold were also top scorers of Ekstraklasa. The list is separated into three parts, coinciding with the three major episodes of Polish football:

1927-1939 → the Polish league structure was changing rapidly. The end of World War II marks the end of this episode.
 1948–63 → the Polish league structure without a nationwide league was maintained without greater changes.
Since 1962-1963 → the nationwide league exists.

Legia have won the national championship 15 times, which makes them the most successful club in the Ekstraklasa. The club also won the Polish Cup 18 times, making them the record holder in number of cups won. Legia is the only Polish club never to have been relegated from the top flight of Polish football after World War II.

Key

 Rank = Final position
 P = Played
 W = Games won
 D = Games drawn
 L = Games lost
 F = Goals for
 A = Goals against
 GD = Goal difference
 Pts = Points
 Avg.Att. = Average attendance at home

 PFC = Polish football championship
 Cup = Polish Cup
 Europe = European competition entered
 Res. = Result in that competition

 — = Not attended
 NQ = Qualification stage
 1R = Round 1
 2R = Round 2
 3R = Round 3
 4R = Round 4
 5R = Round 5
 R32 = Round of 32
 R16 = Round of 16
 Group = Group stage
 QF = Quarter-finals
 SF = Semi-finals
 RU = Runners-Up
 W = Champions

1927-1939

1948–63

Since 1962-63

Bibliography
 List of Legia Warsaw in detail at the 90minut.pl
 List of Ekstraklasa top scorers at the History of Polish Football

References

 
Legia Warsaw
Polish football club seasons